The Jury is an American legal drama television series that aired on Fox from June 8 to August 6, 2004. Each week, in the same New York City courtroom, a new 12-person jury deliberates over a criminal case.  Each episode begins at the start of jury deliberations; the trial is recounted through flashbacks.

Fox announced the series' cancellation in July 2004 due to low ratings, but all ten episodes were aired.

Cast

Main 
 Billy Burke as Attorney John Ranguso
 Adam Busch as Steve Dixson
 Anna Friel as Attorney Megan Delaney
 Cote de Pablo as Marguerite Cisneros
 Jeff Hephner as Attorney Keenan O'Brien
 Shalom Harlow as Attorney Melissa Greenfield

Recurring 
 Barry Levinson as Judge Horatio Hawthorne
 Patrice O'Neal as Adam Walker

Episodes

References

External links 
 

2004 American television series debuts
2004 American television series endings
2000s American crime drama television series
2000s American legal television series
English-language television shows
Fox Broadcasting Company original programming
Television series by 20th Century Fox Television
Television series by HBO Independent Productions
Television shows set in New York City
Television series created by Tom Fontana